Gigel may refer to:

 Gigel, New South Wales

People with the given name
 Gigel Anghel (born 1955), Romanian wrestler
 Gigel Bucur (born 1980), Romanian footballer
 Gigel Coman (born 1978), Romanian footballer
 Gigel Ene (born 1982), Romanian footballer

Romanian masculine given names